Herring is a surname which may refer to:

People
Aggie Herring (1876–1939), American actress
Alfred Cecil Herring (1888–1966), Royal Army Service Corps officer
Amy H. Herring, American biostatistician
Annie Herring, American Christian singer
Art Herring (1906–1995), American baseball player
Aubrey Herring, American track and field athlete
Augustus Moore Herring (1865–1926), American aviation pioneer
Ben Herring (born 1980), New Zealand rugby union footballer
Bill Herring, American baseball player
Caroline Herring, singer-songwriter
Charles R. Herring (born 1945), chiropractor who served in the Louisiana House of Representatives from 1988 to 1992
Clyde L. Herring (1879–1945), American politician
Conyers Herring (born 1914), American physicist
Corey Herring, American basketball player
Cornelius T. Herring (1849-1931), American rancher, banker and hotelier.
Dennis Herring, American record producer
E. Pendleton Herring (1903–2004), American political scientist 
Edmund Herring (1892–1982), Australian Army officer 
Eli Herring, American football player
Elizabeth Warren, née Herring, American politician
Hal Herring (born 1924), American football player and coach 
Hank Herring (1922–1999), American boxer
Heath Herring (born 1978), American mixed martial artist 
Horace Herring (1884–1962), New Zealand politician 
Jamel Herring (1985), American boxer
James Red Herring (1896–1974), American boxer
James V. Herring (1887–1969), American artist
Jan Herring (1923-2000), American artist
Jimmy Herring (born 1962), American rock guitarist
Joanne Herring (born 1929), American entrepreneur, philanthropist, and talk show host
John Frederick Herring Sr. (1795–1865), British painter
John Frederick Herring Jr. (1820–1907), British painter
Katherine Herring (born 1933), All-American Girls Professional Baseball League player
Kim Herring (born 1975), American football player
Louise McCarren Herring (1909–1987), American cooperative activist
Lynn Herring (born 1958), American soap opera actress
Malik Herring (born 1997), American football player
Mark Herring (born 1961), American politician
Mary Herring (1895–1981), Australian physician and community worker 
Pembroke J. Herring (born 1930), American film editor
Percy Herring (1872–1967) New Zealand physician 
Reggie Herring (born 1959), American football coach
Richard Herring (born 1967), British comedian
Robert Herring (poet), Scottish poet
Robert Herring (businessman), American entrepreneur
Rufus G. Herring (1921–1996), United States Naval Reserve officer 
Sydney Herring (1881–1951), Australian Army colonel 
Thomas Herring (1693–1757), Archbishop of Canterbury
Vincent Herring (born 1964), American jazz saxophonist
William Herring (1718–1774), Anglican priest
William Herring (politician) (1833–1912), American politician, lawyer, and businessman
Will Herring (born 1983), American football player

Fictional characters
Albert Herring, from the 1947 comic chamber opera by Benjamin Britten
A henchman of dictator Adenoid Hynkel in The Great Dictator

See also
Senator Herring (disambiguation)

English-language surnames